Lisa Folawiyo is a Nigerian fashion designer.

Biography
Folawiyo has a background in law, which she studied at the University of Lagos. 

She started her label Jewel by Lisa in 2005 from her home, with an initial investment of 20,000 Naira. She bought 12 yards of fabric and made the first pieces with her mother. She has showrooms in Nigeria and in New York. She incorporates traditional West African textiles such as Ankara with modern tailoring techniques and an emphasis on beading and sequin trim. Senegalese-American actress Issa Rae has worn her clothing. In 2012 she was featured in Vogue Italia.

Prizes
2012: Africa Fashion Award
2014: One of eight emerging talents by WWD Women's Wear Daily
2015: Featured in the BOF500

Personal life
Folawiyo had been married for 18 years. She is mother to two children. Her father-in-law was the industrialist Wahab Iyanda Folawiyo.

References

External links

Living people
Nigerian fashion designers
University of Lagos alumni
Nigerian women fashion designers
Nigerian fashion businesspeople
21st-century Nigerian businesswomen
21st-century Nigerian businesspeople
Lisa Folawiyo
Year of birth missing (living people)